Gibberula nussbaumae is a species of sea snail, a marine gastropod mollusk, in the family Cystiscidae. It is named after American philosopher Martha Nussbaum.

Description
The length of the shell attains 2.72 mm.

Distribution
This marine species occurs in Guadeloupe.

References

nussbaumae
Gastropods described in 2015